Ambedkar Nagar Assembly constituency is one of the 70 Delhi Legislative Assembly constituencies of the National Capital Territory in northern India.

Overview
Present geographical structure of Ambedkar Nagar constituency came into existence in 2008 as a part of the implementation of the recommendations of the Delimitation Commission of India constituted in 2002.
Ambedkar Nagar is part of South Delhi Lok Sabha constituency along with nine other Assembly segments, namely Bijwasan, Sangam Vihar, Chhatarpur, Deoli, Kalkaji, Tughlakabad, Palam, Badarpur and Mehrauli.

Members of Legislative Assembly
Key

Election results

2020

2015

2013

2008 results

2003

1998

1993

See also
 First Legislative Assembly of Delhi
 Second Legislative Assembly of Delhi
 Third Legislative Assembly of Delhi
 Fourth Legislative Assembly of Delhi
 Fifth Legislative Assembly of Delhi
 Sixth Legislative Assembly of Delhi

References

Assembly constituencies of Delhi
Delhi Legislative Assembly